JSC Vektor State Enterprise is a company based in Yekaterinburg, Russia. It is part of the Almaz-Antey defense holding.

Vektor State Enterprise produces military electronics including missile-related guidance systems and radars. In the 1990s it was developing conversion products including medical, agricultural, and telecommunications equipment.

References

External links
 Official website

Electronics companies of Russia
Manufacturing companies based in Yekaterinburg
Almaz-Antey
Defence companies of the Soviet Union
Manufacturing companies of the Soviet Union
Ministry of Radio Industry (Soviet Union)
Electronics companies of the Soviet Union
Russian brands
Radar manufacturers